Díly is a municipality and village in Domažlice District in the Plzeň Region of the Czech Republic. It has about 400 inhabitants.

Twin towns – sister cities

Díly is twinned with:
 Rötz, Germany

References

Villages in Domažlice District